Streptocephalus dendrophorus is a species of crustacean in the family Streptocephalidae. It is endemic to South Africa.

References

Branchiopoda
Endemic crustaceans of South Africa
Freshwater crustaceans of Africa
Taxonomy articles created by Polbot
Crustaceans described in 1993